Akrofi is an Akan language surname. Notable people with the surname include:

Clement Anderson Akrofi, philologist, ethnolinguist and translator who worked on the structure of the Twi language 
Hayford Akrofi, Ghanaian political activist
Justice Akrofi (born 1942), Ghanaian Anglican archbishop